Marco Salvatore (born February 20, 1986) is an Austrian professional association football player currently playing for SV Horn in the Austrian Football First League.

References

1986 births
Living people
Austrian footballers
Association football defenders
Austrian Football Bundesliga players
FK Austria Wien players
SK Austria Kärnten players
First Vienna FC players
SV Horn players